Yamakoshi is a surname. Notable people with the surname include:

Kohei Yamakoshi (born 1993), Japanese footballer
Kyotaro Yamakoshi (born 1991), Japanese footballer
Yasuhiro Yamakoshi (born 1985), Japanese footballer

Japanese-language surnames